Kennedy Asamoah Boateng (born 30 November 1989) is a Ghanaian professional footballer. His name has also appeared as Asomon Kenet and Kenneth Asamoah.

Club career
Asamoah played for several clubs in Ghana while young. In summer 2008 he moved abroad to play with Serbian SuperLiga club FK Jagodina. He stayed in Serbia for two seasons playing a total of 20 SuperLiga matches and scoring twice. In late summer 2010 he was loaned to Tanzanian Premier League club Young Africans FC. In 2011, he made the only and winning goal for Young Africans in the CECAFA 2011 Kagame Inter-Club Cup final against Simba S.C.

In 2012, he returned to Europe, this time to Romanian side FC Vaslui however failed to make it to the first team, ad after a year has signed with Ghanaian top-flight side Medeama SC.

Kennedy Boateng has played for several Ghanaian teams and from 2013 to 2016 he played for Medeama in the Ghana Premier League.

International career
In November 2013, coach Maxwell Konadu invited him to be a part of the Ghana squad for the 2013 WAFU Nations Cup. He helped the team to a first-place finish after Ghana beat Senegal by three goals to one.

Honours
Young Africans
Tanzanian Premier League: 2010–11
Kagame Inter-Club Cup: 2011

Medeama SC
Ghanaian FA Cup: 2015
Ghana Super Cup: 2015
Ghana
WAFU Nations Cup: 2013
African Nations Championship Runner-up: 2014

References

External links
 

1989 births
Living people
Ghanaian footballers
Ghana international footballers
Association football forwards
Medeama SC players
Ghana Premier League players
WAFU Nations Cup players
2014 African Nations Championship players
FK Jagodina players
FK Borac Čačak players
Serbian SuperLiga players
Expatriate footballers in Serbia
Ghanaian expatriate sportspeople in Serbia
Young Africans S.C. players
Expatriate footballers in Tanzania
Ghanaian expatriate sportspeople in Romania
Tanzanian Premier League players
Ghana A' international footballers
Ghanaian expatriate sportspeople in Tanzania